Your Scene is a KBS drama that began airing on April 30, 2007. It got low ratings.

Plot
A story about a woman named Han Su-ryeon who goes out with Park Dong-hyek and breaks up with him. But it is too late: They already have a baby girl (later named Bobae). Su-ryeon later marries Wo Jong-ku who cares for her more than Dong-hyek; a problem arises when she finds out that Bobae is her daughter.

Details
Airtime: April 30, 2007 to November 9, 2007
Homepage: http://www.kbs.co.kr/drama/urscene/

Cast
Heo Yeong-lan as Han Su-ryeon
Kim Chul-ki as Wo Jong-ku
Mun-su as Park Dong-hyek
Son Yeon-ju as Im Yeo-won
Kim Hyeon-ju as Han Yeong-ok
Choi Jeong-won as Jeong-sun

References

Korean Broadcasting System television dramas
Korean-language television shows
2007 South Korean television series debuts
2007 South Korean television series endings